Evgeny Aleksandrovich Maleev (25 February 1915 – 12 April 1966) was a Soviet and Russian paleontologist who did most of his research on reptiles and Asian fossils, such as the naming of the ankylosaur Talarurus and theropods Tarbosaurus and Therizinosaurus along with the family Therizinosauridae.

Biography
Evgeny Aleksandrovich Maleev was born on February 25, 1915, in the Russian Empire. After being a member on the Eastern Front (World War II) he started his scientific career at the Moscow State University. In 1947 he graduated from the Faculty of Biology, also in that year, he started to work at the Paleontological Institute, Russian Academy of Sciences. In 1950 Maleev presented his PhD thesis, "Morphofunctional analysis of the occipital region of the skull and skeleton of the neck of mammals", being awarded the Candidate of Sciences. Later on, he worked as the deputy manager from 1956 to 1962. He also was the leader of an expedition conducted in 1962 to Indonesia with the purpose of analyze Komodo dragon specimens. Maleev did notable research on the institute until this death in 1966.

Scientific research
Maleev is recognised for his research on Asiatic prehistoric life, such as the naming and description of the famous dinosaurs Talarurus, Tarbosaurus and Therizinosaurus. In honor to his contribution to science, two dinosaurs were named in honor to Maleev: Maleevus and Maleevosaurus.

Although his PhD thesis was mainly focused on mammals, his interests were oriented to reptiles. In 1948 he was a member of the Joint Soviet-Mongolian Paleontological Expedition conducted on the Gobi Desert of Mongolia. The expedition ended up on the discovery of Talarurus, and later described by him in 1952. When first described, based on the claws, Maleev interpreted the remains of Therizinosaurus as belonging to a gigantic turtle-like reptile, also he named the family Therizinosauridae. After a long debate, the enigmatic fossils were later confirmed to belong to a giant theropod dinosaur.

At some point, Maleev analyzed Tarbosaurus brains by cutting open the fossilized braincases with a diamond saw. In contrast to the risky methods used by Maleev, modern researchers use computer tomography scans  and 3D reconstruction software (CT scans) to visualize the interior of dinosaur endocrania, thus eliminating the need to damage valuable specimens.

Selected publications

See also
 Halszka Osmólska
 Kenneth Carpenter
 Teresa Maryańska

References

Soviet paleontologists
1915 births
1966 deaths
Moscow State University alumni
Soviet military personnel of World War II
Place of birth missing
Place of death missing